The 1965 Nebraska Cornhuskers football team was the representative of the University of Nebraska and member of the Big Eight Conference in the 1965 NCAA University Division football season. The team was coached by Bob Devaney and played their home games at Memorial Stadium in Lincoln, Nebraska.

Before the season

Schedule

Roster

Depth chart

|}

Coaching staff

Game summaries

TCU

Air Force

Iowa State

Wisconsin

Kansas State

Colorado

Missouri

Kansas

Oklahoma State

Oklahoma

Alabama

Rankings

Awards
 All American: Walter Barnes, Tony Jeter, Larry Wachholtz, Freeman White
 All Big 8: LaVerne Allers, Dennis Carlson, Walt Barnes, Tony Jeter, Muike Kennedy, Frank Solich, Larry Wachholtz, Freeman White

Future professional players
Walter Barnes, 1966 2nd-round pick of the Washington Redskins
 James Brown, 1966 13th-round pick of the St. Louis Cardinals
 Kaye Carstens, 1967 13th-round pick of the Chicago Bears
 Dick Czap, 1966 12th-round pick of the Cleveland Browns
 Ben Gregory, 1968 5th-round pick of the Buffalo Bills
 Tony Jeter, 1966 3rd-round pick of the Green Bay Packers
 Ron Kirkland, 1967 9th-round pick of the Indianapolis Colts
Wayne Meylan, 1968 4th-round pick of the Cleveland Browns
 Lynn Senkbeil, 1966 16th-round pick of the Chicago Bears
 Carel Stith, 1967 4th-round pick of the Houston Oilers
 Bob Taucher, 1968 7th-round pick of the Dallas Cowboys
 Pete Tatman, 1967 10th-round pick of the Minnesota Vikings
 Freeman White, 1966 9th-round pick of the New York Giants
 Harry Wilson, 1967 3rd-round pick of the Philadelphia Eagles

References

Nebraska
Nebraska Cornhuskers football seasons
Big Eight Conference football champion seasons
Nebraska Cornhuskers football